The Estonia women's national 3x3 team is the 3x3 basketball team representing Estonia in international women's competitions, organized and run by the Estonian Basketball Association.

Competitive record

World Cup

Europe Cup

European Games

References

External links
Official website
FIBA 2019 profile

Basketball in Estonia
Basketball
Women's national 3x3 basketball teams